The 2011–12 season was Partick Thistle's sixth consecutive season in the Scottish First Division, having been promoted from the Scottish Second Division at the end of the 2005–06 season. Partick Thistle also competed in the Challenge Cup, League Cup and the Scottish Cup.

Summary
Partick Thistle finished sixth in the First Division. They reached the second round of the Challenge Cup, the first round of the League Cup and the fourth round of the Scottish Cup.

Results and fixtures

Pre season

Scottish First Division

Scottish Cup

Scottish League Cup

Scottish Challenge Cup

Player statistics

Captains

Squad 
Last updated 5 May 2012

|}

Disciplinary record

Includes all competitive matches.

Last updated 5 May 2012

Awards

Last updated 14 May 2012

League table

Transfers

Players in

Players out

References

External links
 PTFC Matches

Partick Thistle F.C. seasons
Partick Thistle